{{DISPLAYTITLE:C8H12N2O2}}
The molecular formula C8H12N2O2 (molar mass: 168.193 g/mol) may refer to:

 Hexamethylene diisocyanate
 Pyridoxamine

Molecular formulas